Brunei Darussalam's diplomatic missions and general foreign policy are managed by the Ministry of Foreign Affairs and Trade. It has a limited number of missions, most being concentrated in Southeast Asia and the Persian Gulf. As of 2021 the Bruneian diplomatic network is composed of 35 embassies and high commissions, 4 consulates general, 3 permanent missions to international organisations, and the trade and tourism office in Taipei, which serves as Brunei's de facto embassy to Taiwan. 

As a member of the Commonwealth of Nations, Bruneian diplomatic missions in the capitals of other Commonwealth members are known as High Commissions.

Excluded from this listing are honorary consulates and trade missions, with the exception of the trade and tourism office in Taipei.

History

Prior to full independence in 1984, Brunei was a British protectorate, with international representation being the responsibility of the United Kingdom, in which its interests were represented by the "Brunei Government Agency" in London. A Government Agency was also established in Kuala Lumpur, Malaysia, at the end of 1981. This was later renamed the Brunei Commission. When Brunei joined the Commonwealth on independence, these became known as High Commissions. In 1983, shortly before independence, the country established a Government Agency in Manila, in the Philippines, which was later upgraded to an Embassy.

Africa

America

Asia

Europe

Oceania

Multilateral organisations

Gallery

See also

 Foreign relations of Brunei
 List of diplomatic missions in Brunei
 Visa policy of Brunei

References

 
Brunei
Diplomatic missions